The 1933 Drake Bulldogs football team was an American football team that represented Drake University in the Missouri Valley Conference (MVC) during the 1933 college football season. In its first season under head coach Vee Green, the team compiled a 6–3–1 record (5–1 against MVC opponents), finished second in the conference, and was outscored by a total of 105 to 74.

Schedule

References

Drake
Drake Bulldogs football seasons
Drake Bulldogs football